Piz Tavrü is a mountain in the Sesvenna Range of the Alps, located north of the Ofen Pass in the canton of Graubünden. Its southern side is part of the Swiss National Park.

References

External links
 Piz Tavrü on Hikr

Mountains of the Alps
Mountains of Graubünden
Alpine three-thousanders
Mountains of Switzerland
Scuol
Val Müstair